Parade of the Athletes is a retrospective mix by Dutch DJ Tiësto of his live set performed during the opening ceremony of the 2004 Summer Olympic Games in Athens, Greece on 13 August 2004 (see 2004 in music). This was the first time that a DJ was asked to perform for a ceremony at the Olympics. Recognizing one of their own, the Dutch team came up to the booth while Tiësto was performing this set. All of the songs on this track are original songs composed by Tiësto except for "Adagio for Strings", which is his own remix of Samuel Barber's piece by the same name (the remix was also influenced by William Orbit's original electronic remix of the piece in 1999), and "Athena", which is also a remix of Adagio in G minor, a piece often attributed to Tomaso Albinoni, but actually composed by Remo Giazotto.

The album contains 8 new tracks composed exclusively for the Olympic Games Athens 2004 Opening Ceremony, and 4 other well-known tracks ("Traffic", "Lethal Industry", "Adagio for Strings" and "Forever Today"). An unmixed version was also released.

Track listing

Credits
 Mastered by: Barney Broomer for Sonic One
 Written by, composed by, producer, mixed by: Tiësto
 Additional producer: D.J. Waakop Reijers
 "Breda 8pm" DJ Montana's edit of "Dallas 4PM" from Tiësto's debut album In My Memory.
 "Ancient History" Tiësto's interpretation of "Zilevo Tou Stavraetou" by Rizitiko.
 "Traffic" samples "Psykofuk" by Sean Deason.
 "Athena" Tiësto's interpretation of "Adagio in G Minor" by Giazotto.
 "Olympic Flame" Composer(s): Geert Huinink and Daniël Stewart
 "Adagio for Strings"' Composer(s): Samuel Barber
 "Victorious" Composer(s): Geert Huinink and Daniël Stewart
 "Forever Today"'' Composer(s): Geert Huinink and Daniël Stewart

Charts and certifications

Weekly charts

Year-end charts

Certifications

Release history

References

Tiësto compilation albums
2004 compilation albums
Sports compilation albums